Don Bosco School, is an educational institute located in Alaknanda, New Delhi, India. It is an all-boys English medium school imparting education from Kindergarten (Pre-Primary) through 12th grade with a campus spanning 10.37 acres. Established at its current site in as early as 1980, it is running by the one and a half century old organisation The Order of the Salesians of Don Bosco. It is affiliated to the Central Board of Secondary Education, New Delhi, and the teaching methods adopted include the Salesian Preventive System.It has a full size football ground, 3 basketball courts, 1 playground (for kindergarten children), and 4 badminton courts. Other facilities include a sick room, an auditorium and a canteen.

EducationWorld India Rankings

City Wide Ranking
A rank of Number 1 was achieved in 2013  for the city of New Delhi.

Statewide ranking
The school received an all-time high rating in 2013 of Number 2 in its category (All Boys Category) amongst all schools in the National Capital Territory of Delhi.

All India Ranking
Don Bosco School was ranked at Number 15 throughout the country in the Year 2013. The rankings for this were based from a pool of over 1.4 million schools around the country.

Sister schools in New Delhi
Holy Child Auxillium School is a sister institution, run by the nuns of the Salesian Sisters of Mary Help of Christians, also known as the Salesian Sisters of Don Bosco.

References

External links
 

Schools in Delhi
CBSE Delhi